Amir Tsarfati (born  October 22, 1972) is an Israeli public figure, author, Bible teacher, and Middle East news correspondent/commentator. He is known for his Bible prophecy teachings, his insight into world events, and his fiction and non-fiction books. He is founder and president of Behold Israel.

Early life 
Tsarfati was born in Jerusalem, Israel, on October 22, 1972, to a Jewish family. For most of his childhood he was in the foster care system. After completing his mandatory military service, he studied at Israel's School of Tourism at Hebrew University in Israel.

Career 
Amir Tsarfati served in the Israel Defense Forces achieving the rank of major. At one point during his service he held the position of deputy governor of Jericho.
After his time in the military, he became a tour guide in Israel. Later, he served as CEO of Sar El Tours.

Amir Tsarfati became associated with Calvary Chapel founder Chuck Smith while guiding a tour of Israel. His interactions with Pastor Chuck were the catalyst which led him to pursue becoming a Bible prophecy teacher.

In 2001, Tsarfati founded a non-profit organization called Behold Israel, which originally focused on reporting current events and developments in Israel and the region. It has since expanded to an international ministry with extensive in-person teachings and conferences, online resources, and published books and materials focused on Bible prophecy as it relates to current world events.

Personal life
Amir is married to Miriam Tsarfati. They have four children, one of whom is married.

Media appearances
Amir Tsarfati often appears on television, radio, and podcasts to discuss current events in Israel and the world. He was also one of the featured experts in the Before The Wrath film. Tsarfati is regularly used as a source in magazine articles.

Select bibliography

Non-fiction books
 The Last Hour: An Israeli Insider Looks at the End Times (2018). .
 The Day Approaching: An Israeli's Message of Warning and Hope for the Last Days (2020). .
 Israel and the Church: An Israeli Examines God's Unfolding Plans for His Chosen Peoples (2021). .
 Revealing Revelation: How God's Plans for the Future Can Change Your Life Now (2022). .
 Bible Prophecy: The Essentials (2023). .
 Has the Tribulation Begun? (Releasing May of 2023).

∗Revealing Revelation became a bestseller on numerous lists, including Amazon's Best Sellers, Publishers Weekly, USA Today, and the Wall Street Journal. It was also ranked number one by the Evangelical Christian Publishers Association (ECPA).

Fiction books
 Operation Joktan: A Nir Tavor Mossad Thriller #1 (2021).*   .
 By Way of Deception: A Nir Tavor Mossad Thriller #2 (2022).

∗Operation Joktan became a USA Today, Wall Street Journal, Publishers Weekly, and Evangelical Christian Publishers Association Bestseller, reaching #1 on the PW and ECPA lists. It also received the ECPA Bronze Award for selling over 100,000 copies.

References

External links
 Behold Israel

1972 births
Living people
21st-century evangelicals
Evangelical writers
Hebrew University of Jerusalem alumni
Israeli social commentators